The 8th Orgburo of the Russian Communist Party (Bolsheviks) was elected by the 1st Plenary Session of the  8th Central Committee, in the immediate aftermath of the 8th Congress.

Full members

Candidate members

Members of the Orgburo of the Central Committee of the Communist Party of the Soviet Union
1919 establishments in Russia
1920 disestablishments in Russia